39 Tauri is a binary star in the northern constellation of Taurus. It has an apparent visual magnitude of 5.90, so, according to the Bortle scale, it is faintly visible from suburban skies at night. Measurements made with the Hipparcos spacecraft show an annual parallax shift of 0.0594728″, which is equivalent to a distance of around 55 light years from the Sun.

39 Tauri has been resolved into a pair of stars using speckle interferometry.  However, many observations have failed to resolve the secondary star.

A stellar classification of G5 V matches that of a G-type main sequence star; the type of the secondary component is unknown. Stellar models indicate the primary component is similar in physical properties to the Sun, with 110% of the Sun's mass, 96% of the radius, and shining with almost the same luminosity. The overall metallicity of the star—the abundance of elements other than hydrogen and helium—is similar to the Sun. At a relatively youthful estimated age of one billion years, it is rotating with a period of 9.12 days. Based upon Hipparcos data, it displays a mild variability with an amplitude of 0.06 magnitude.

The space velocity components of 39 Tauri are: –25.0(U), –14.0(V), –6.0(W). The surface activity and kinematic properties of this star are consistent with membership in the IC 2391 moving group.

References

G-type main-sequence stars
Astrometric binaries
Taurus (constellation)
Tauri, A2
Tauri, 039
1262
Durchmusterung objects
Gliese and GJ objects
025680
019076